PT100 or PT-100 may refer to:

 A type of the Taurus PT92 pistol
 A type of resistance thermometer
 Panzerfaust, a German anti-tank weapon of World War II